"634-5789 (Soulsville, U.S.A.)" is a soul song written by Eddie Floyd and Steve Cropper. It was first recorded by Wilson Pickett on December 20, 1965  and included on his 1966 Atlantic Records album The Exciting Wilson Pickett with backing vocals by Patti LaBelle and the Blue Belles. The single reached number 1 on the Billboard Hot Rhythm & Blues Singles chart and number 13 on the Hot 100 singles chart.

Background
The phone number 634-5789 is a reference to the Marvelettes' 1962 hit "Beechwood 4-5789".

Chart performance

Tina Turner version

Tina Turner recorded a live version of the track in 1986 as part of a segment in her Break Every Rule TV special, in which she interpreted classic soul songs with guitarist and singer Robert Cray, including "634-5789", Sam Cooke's "A Change Is Gonna Come" and Wilson Pickett's "Land of a Thousand Dances" and "In the Midnight Hour". The four tracks were later included on her 1988 album Tina Live in Europe and "634-5789", sung as a duet with Cray, was also issued as a single in certain territories, reaching number 14 on the Dutch singles chart. The B-sides were "Private Dancer" and "Help!", both taken from the Tina Live in Europe album.

Chart performance

Other recordings
The song has also been recorded by: Otis Redding, Ry Cooder, Bon Jovi, Johnny Van Zant, Tower of Power, Trace Adkins, The Elgins and Rare Earth.

Popular culture
Eddie Floyd, Wilson Pickett, and Jonny Lang appeared in the 1998 movie Blues Brothers 2000 and performed "634-5789". Floyd and Pickett played the proprietors of "Ed's Love Exchange" which, according to the storyline in the movie, could be reached at 1-900-634-5789 (a reference to phone sex lines).

See also
"853-5937"
"867-5309/Jenny"
Fictitious telephone number

References

1966 songs
1966 singles
1988 singles
Wilson Pickett songs
Tina Turner songs
Songs about telephone calls
Songs written by Steve Cropper
Songs written by Eddie Floyd
Atlantic Records singles
The Blues Brothers songs